Jarilla is a genus in the family Caricaceae of Brassicales.

Species
The genus Jarilla has four plant species native to Mexico, Guatemala and El Salvador.

Jarilla caudata- Mexico (Baja California Sur, Guanajuato, Hidalgo, Jalisco, Michoacan, Queretaro, San Luis Potosi, Sinaloa)
Jarilla chocola- Mexico (Chiapas, Chihuahua, Colima, Jalisco, Michoacan, Nayarit, Oaxaca, Sinaloa, Sonora), Guatemala, El Salvador
Jarilla heterophylla- Mexico (Colima, Ciudad de Mexico, Guanajuato, Guerrero, Hidalgo, Jalisco, Mexico State, Michoacan, Oaxaca, Puebla, Queretaro, San Luis Potosi, Zacatecas) 
Jarilla nana- Mexico (Ciudad de Mexico, Guanajuato, Guerrero, Hidalgo, Jalisco, Mexico State, Michoacan, Nayarit, Queretaro, Zacatecas)

References

Caricaceae
Flora of South America
Flora of Central America
Flora of North America
Brassicales genera